Reduplication in Russian is used to intensify meaning in different ways.

Reduplication is also observable in borrowed words, such as "" (ping-pong) and "" (zig-zag), but since the words were borrowed as is from other languages, they are not examples of reduplication as it works in the  grammar of Russian.

Syllabic/root/stem reduplication
There is virtually no productive syllabic or root/stem reduplication in the modern Russian language.

An ancient lexical stratum of the Russian language provides examples such as "" (mommy), "" (daddy), "" (granny)—a phenomenon common to many languages. It is argued that these words originated in the reduplicated babbling of infants.

Word reduplication
Word reduplications are mostly the feature of the colloquial language and in most cases do not constitute separate dictionary entries.  Word reduplication may occur in the following forms: 
a hyphenated word, both of standard vocabulary or standard ad hoc word formation
exact reduplication:
"" ("very few", lit. "few-few")—a vocabulary word
"" ("very white (snow)", lit. "white-white (snow)")—ad hoc formation, for adjectives
inflected reduplication:
"" ("very long time ago", lit. "pastly-past")
"" ("very white", lit. "whitely-white")
Reduplication of adjectives using the enhancement preposition ""
"" ("very big", lit. "big-very-big"
"" ("very white", lit. "white-very-white")
A repetition of a word in dialogues as a device used either to request or to promise a higher degree of cooperation:
"" or "",—a general-purpose urge to do something, literally "give it, give it!", meaning "Come on!" or "Let's do it!"
"" ("Run, run!")—a specific urge to run: to run fast or to run right away.
""—an enhanced agreement: "Of course, of course!"
"" ( "Yes, yes")—an utterance used in dialogs to indicate either constant attention ("yes, yes, I am listening") or agreement ("yes, yes, of course")
Shm-reduplication and m-reduplication, to express irony, borrowed from Yiddish and Central Asian cultures respectively, sometimes used as a mockery of the corresponding languages or peoples; see Russian jokes about Georgians for examples of this phenomenon
As an expression of a frequentative or of a prolonged action
"" ("They are pulling and pulling, but cannot pull it [the turnip] out")—a phrase from the classical fairy tale Repka ("", "The Turnip")
"" ("[he] is looking and looking")
"" ("[he] went and went")
Onomatopoeic reduplication
"" (the sound of the droplets of water)
"" or ""; the sound of a clock ticking
""; bowwow, barking of a dog
Frequentative, often combined with ideophonic/onomatopoeic derivation
"", from "", "to slash with a knife"
"", from "" ("to jump", "to hop").  A similar derivation in English would be "When the red red robin/Comes bob bob bobbing along").

Affixal reduplication
A peculiarity of Russian language is synonymic affixal reduplication, whereby a root may acquire two productive suffixes or prefixes, different, but of the same semantics, with the corresponding intensification of the meaning: 
Affectional diminutives:
""→""→"" ( "girlfriend").  Here, ""→"" is an example of consonant mutation, and "" and "" are two diminutive-generating suffixes. This kind of word formation is especially productive for given names: "" ("Catherine")→"" (hypocoristic)→"" ( "Katyusha")→""→"" (sounds intentionally ridiculous)
Another example:
"" ("to forget")→"" ("to forget for a while")→""

See also
Amredita
Babbling

References

Russian language
Reduplication